Orange Grove Mobile Manor is a census-designated place (CDP) and colonia in Yuma County, Arizona, United States. The population was 555 at the 2010 census. It is part of the Yuma Metropolitan Statistical Area.

Geography
Orange Grove Mobile Manor is located at  (32.598451, -114.660588). It is located to the south of the East Cocopah Indian Reservation.

Demographics

References

Census-designated places in Yuma County, Arizona